Sea Priest is the only studio album by Adelaide based band Fire! Santa Rosa, Fire!, released in 2010 on Dot Dash.

Track listing

References

2010 albums
Fire! Santa Rosa, Fire! albums